Anniesland College was a small, local further education college in Glasgow, Scotland, established in 1964.

The college had seven schools, offering a range of courses and levels of study, full-time, part-time or flexibly. This new building is at Hatfield Drive, with a three-storey classroom block, two-storey workshops, a multimedia library and nursery. Anniesland College offered many outreach courses in community centres and schools, and had links with other colleges, universities and local industry including shipbuilding.

Notable students

Kenny Dalglish, the Scottish international football player was briefly a student, as an apprentice joiner, in the late 1960s.

Alex Kapranos (Huntley) was a part-time lecturer in IT for a couple of years until June 2003, when Franz Ferdinand, the Glasgow indie rock band, of which he was lead singer/guitarist, signed a recording contract with Domino Recording Company.

Mergers

On 17 November 2011, Cardonald College announced it had entered merger talks with Anniesland College and on 28 March 2012 it was announced by Cardonald College principal, Susan Walsh, that a merger with Cardonald College, Anniesland College and Langside College was "highly likely."

On 30 July 2012, the colleges agreed to push ahead with merger plans and named The Guardian reporter and Cardonald College journalism lecturer, Kirsty Scott, the Merger Communications Manager. 

On 28 August 2012, a formal consultation was launched and ran until 16 November 2012.

On 14 December 2012, Cardonald College principal Susan Walsh was appointed principal of the new college.  

On 1 August 2013, Anniesland College, along with Cardonald College and Langside College, were absorbed to form Glasgow Clyde College. As a result of the merger, Anniesland College became Glasgow Clyde College Anniesland Campus.

See also
 Glasgow Clyde College
 List of further and higher education colleges in Scotland

References

External links
 (Will redirect to Glasgow Clyde College website).

Further education colleges in Glasgow